The 1911 Northwestern Purple team represented Northwestern University during the 1911 college football season. In their second year under head coach Charles Hammett, the Purple compiled a 3–4 record (1–4 against Western Conference opponents) and finished in seventh place in the Western Conference.

Schedule

References

Northwestern
Northwestern Wildcats football seasons
Northwestern Purple football